Wellington Point is a residential locality in the City of Redland, Queensland, Australia. The suburb is a popular seaside destination within the Brisbane metropolitan area and is notable for a popular walk along a sandbar to King Island which emerges at low tide.

Geography

Wellington Point is about 22 km south-east of Brisbane, the capital of Queensland. Wellington Point is largely residential and adjoins Birkdale in the west and Ormiston to the south east.

The locality derives its name from the headland called Wellington Point which extends prominently into Moreton Bay. The headland and its adjoining waters are used extensively for aquatic sports. The area is also a popular day-trip destination. While it is predominantly urban, Wellington Point retains a seaside and village atmosphere.

History
The people of the Quandamooka lived in the Redlands long before white settlement. Food was plentiful and skillfully hunted, fished and collected. Tribes of the Yuggera language group inhabited the whole area, with the tribe inhabiting the mainland coastal strip stretching from Redland Bay to the mouth of the Brisbane River being called the Koobenpul.

It is considered that the first Europeans to travel through Wellington Point were three shipwrecked timber getters, Pamphlett, Finnegan and Parsons in 1823.

Wellington Point was named by surveyors Robert Dixon and James Warner in 1842 after the Duke of Wellington who led the army of the United Kingdom in the Battle of Waterloo in 1815. The bay formed in part by Wellington Point was named Waterloo Bay. The first European settlers arrived in Wellington Point in the mid-1860s after the first land sales of 1864 at which one of the big purchasers was Thomas Lodge Murray-Prior. Another purchaser was Captain Louis Hope, who built Ormiston House and established a major sugar plantation and milling operation in Ormiston.

Around 1869, Gilbert Burnett come to the district, taking over  Captain Louis Hope's sugar mill before purchasing land at Wellington Point, where he grew sugarcane and erected a sugar mill. In 1889 he built the two-storey house Fernbourne in Fernbourne Road (the third house he built by this name in the district).

Early industries included growing sugar cane, timber cutting, fruit and vegetable farming and fishing. (Of these the only surviving industry of any significance is fruit and vegetable farming though rapidly increasing urbanisation has reduced this industry to very low levels.)

In the 1889 a railway line from Brisbane, Queensland was built to Cleveland, Queensland passing through Wellington Point. This led to greater travel to Wellington Point and the opening up of yet more land. The line was closed in 1960 due to lack of use. In 1988 the railway station was re-opened and the rail link to Brisbane was re-established. The Wellington Point reserve, opened in the 1880s was closed in 1974.

In 1887 Gilbert Burnett subdivided more of his Wellington Point holdings, especially around the railway station. Edith, Alice and Matilda Streets were laid out and named after three of Burnett's daughters.

Wellington Point State School opened on 9 May 1887.

The first Methodist church was established in 1888, as was the original Wellington Point Hotel which was demolished in 1972 but has since been rebuilt. Another house called Fernbourne was constructed in 1889, but was renamed Whepstead Manor in 1900.

By 1893 the population of the area was 260 most involved in the primary sector and the service sector and by 1897 the end of Wellington Point was set aside as a recreation reserve.

The Point's popularity continued to grow with special fruit trains run to the area in 1906 to sample the strawberries and to visit the gardens and vineyards and by 1911 retirees and commuters began to move into the area and more housing blocks were set aside.

Banyan figs were planted at the point in 1924, by 1925 the first kiosk at the point was established and in 1927 the Moreton Bay Figs were planted giving the point many of its most iconic features.

Whilst the great depression in the late 20s and 30s was a personal tragedy for many, it was also a time of work creation and the development of infrastructure. An interesting development at the point was the drilling for oil which began in 1931. The drilling was commercially unsuccessful, but it did attract the interest of the Prime Minister and the Catholic Church. 1931 was also the year that town electricity was first provided in the area and the Wellington Point jetty was completed in 1937.

The Second World War had a significant effect on Wellington Point and arguably the most obvious consequence was the US camp during 1943 and 1944 when 1500 US forces camped there and conducted shooting and bombing practice.

After the war the pace of life slowed but change was coming. In 1959 a chemist, doctor's surgery, butcher, garage and fish shop were set up and with the arrival of reticulated water in 1969, farmland began to be sub-divided for house blocks.

In 1983 the Redland Cricketers Club was opened.

Wellington Point State High School opened on 25 January 1988.

Redlands College was established on 1 February 1988 by an association of members of the Churches of Christ in Australia.

The median age of the Wellington Point population was 39 years, 2 years above the national median of 37. 73.1% of people living in Wellington Point were born in Australia. The other top responses for country of birth were England 7.7%, New Zealand 5.1%, South Africa 1.8%, Scotland 1.2%, Netherlands 0.5%. 90.8% of people spoke only English at home; the next most common languages were 0.5% German, 0.5% Italian, 0.4% Afrikaans, 0.4% Punjabi, 0.3% Finnish.

On 4 September 2012, the historic Fernbourne House was destroyed by fire. It was a two-storey building built in 1889 by pioneer Gilbert Burnett. It was the third house he had built with that name; the first being on the site of the present Whepstead Manor.

In July 2020, Brisbane Airport opened its new parallel runway, causing a significant increase in air traffic over Wellington Point. Depending on wind conditions, Wellington Point experiences 110+ flights per day, with a monthly average of 38. This has led to some community anger, led by the federal member for Bowman, Henry Pike.

Heritage listings
Wellington Point has a number of heritage-listed sites, including:
 2A Main Road: Wellington Point Reserve
 563 Main Road: Whepstead

Significant features

Significant features include the point, King Island (which is joined to the point at low tide by a natural sand causeway), Redlands Sporting Club, Sovereign Waters (a lakeside housing development), and Whepstead Manor (a significant historical residence) and a shopping and restaurant precinct which contains the Wellington Point Clock Tower.

Education
Wellington Point State School is a government primary (Prep-6) school for boys and girls at 476 Main Road. In 2017, the school had an enrolment of 546 students with 44 teachers (33 full-time equivalent) and 22 non-teaching staff (13 full-time equivalent). It includes a special education program.

Wellington Point State High School is a government secondary (7-12) school for boys and girls at Feb-36 Badgen Road. In 2017, the school had an enrolment of 914 students with 80 teachers (76 full-time equivalent) and 37 non-teaching staff (24 full-time equivalent). It includes a special education program.

Redlands College is a private primary and secondary (Prep-12) school for boys and girls at 38 Anson Road. In 2017, the school had an enrolment of 1,319 students with 109 teachers (99 full-time equivalent) and 82 non-teaching staff (58 full-time equivalent).

Amenities 
The Redland City Council operates a mobile library service which visits Main Road.

Public transport
A railway service to Brisbane and other suburbs on the line between Brisbane and Cleveland, Queensland is accessed at the Wellington Point railway station.

References

Further reading

External links

 

 
Suburbs of Redland City
Coastline of Queensland
Localities in Queensland